PUVA lentigines is a cutaneous condition caused by PUVA therapy.

References 

Melanocytic nevi and neoplasms